Surrender to the Air is an album by free jazz ensemble Surrender to the Air, released in 1996.

Marshall Allen, Michael Ray, and Damon R. Choice were members of Sun Ra's Arkestra. Phish often watched Sun Ra videos on their tour bus; Jon Fishman would listen to Sun Ra interviews after Phish concerts.

Surrender to the Air marked the beginning of Trey Anastasio's solo career.

Critical reception
AllMusic wrote that the album "recalls a free form, improvisation-based jazz record more than hippie rock; in that sense, it is close to the actual spirit of the Grateful Dead, if not their sound." The Tampa Bay Times called it "more like a disappointing mish-mash of instrumental indulgences than any sort of coherent musical statement." The Tulsa World called the album "hippie avant garde," writing that Anastasio "jumps feet first into an insanity of jazz."

Track listing

Personnel
 Marshall Allen: saxophone
 Trey Anastasio: guitar
 Kofi Burbridge: flute
 Oteil Burbridge: bass guitar
 Damon R. Choice: vibraphone
 Jon Fishman: drums
 Bob Gulloti: drums
 James Harvey: trombone
 John Medeski: organ
 Michael Ray: trumpet
 Marc Ribot: guitar

References

1996 albums
Elektra Records albums
Surrender to the Air albums